Novak Djokovic defeated Roger Federer in the final, 3–6, 6–3, 7–6(7–3), to win the men's singles tennis title at the 2014 Indian Wells Masters. It was his third Indian Wells title.

Rafael Nadal was the defending champion, but lost in the third round to Alexandr Dolgopolov.

Seeds
All seeds receive a bye into the second round.

 Rafael Nadal (third round)
 Novak Djokovic (champion)
 Stanislas Wawrinka (fourth round)
 Tomáš Berdych (second round)
 Andy Murray (fourth round)
 Juan Martín del Potro (withdrew because of a wrist injury)
 Roger Federer (final)
 Richard Gasquet (third round)
 Jo-Wilfried Tsonga (second round)
 Milos Raonic (quarterfinals)
 Tommy Haas (fourth round)
 John Isner (semifinals)
 Fabio Fognini (fourth round)
 Mikhail Youzhny (withdrew because of a back injury)
 Grigor Dimitrov (third round)
 Tommy Robredo (third round)
 Kevin Anderson (quarterfinals)
 Jerzy Janowicz (second round)
 Kei Nishikori (third round)
 Ernests Gulbis (quarterfinals)
 Gilles Simon (second round)
 Philipp Kohlschreiber (second round)
 Gaël Monfils (third round)
 Marin Čilić (fourth round)
 Vasek Pospisil (second round)
 Florian Mayer (second round, retired because of a leg injury)
 Dmitry Tursunov (third round)
 Alexandr Dolgopolov (semifinals)
 Andreas Seppi (third round)
 Fernando Verdasco (fourth round)
 Ivan Dodig (second round)
 Pablo Andújar (second round)

Draw

Finals

Top half

Section 1

Section 2

Section 3

Section 4

Bottom half

Section 5

Section 6

Section 7

Section 8

Qualifying

Seeds

 Somdev Devvarman (first round)
 Dušan Lajović (qualified)
 David Goffin (qualifying competition, lucky loser)
 Stéphane Robert (qualified)
 Paolo Lorenzi (qualified)
 Dominic Thiem (qualified)
 Guido Pella (qualifying competition)
 Evgeny Donskoy (qualifying competition, lucky loser)
 Jan Hájek (first round)
 Paul-Henri Mathieu (qualified)
 Alex Kuznetsov (qualified)
 Wayne Odesnik (first round)
 Andrej Martin (qualifying competition)
 Peter Polansky (qualified)
 Jimmy Wang (first round)
 Thiemo de Bakker (first round)
 Damir Džumhur (first round)
 James Ward (qualifying competition, lucky loser)
 Ruben Bemelmans (qualifying competition)
 Illya Marchenko (first round)
 Guilherme Clezar (first round)
 Samuel Groth (qualified)
 Bobby Reynolds (qualifying competition)
 Rik de Voest (withdrew)

Qualifiers

Lucky losers

Qualifying draw

First qualifier

Second qualifier

Third qualifier

Fourth qualifier

Fifth qualifier

Sixth qualifier

Seventh qualifier

Eighth qualifier

Ninth qualifier

Tenth qualifier

Eleventh qualifier

Twelfth qualifier

Notes

a.  James Ward received a lucky loser spot in the main draw after No. 6 seed Juan Martín del Potro withdrew with a wrist injury.
b.  Evgeny Donskoy received a lucky loser spot in the main draw after No. 14 seed Mikhail Youzhny withdrew with a back injury.
c.  Jarkko Nieminen advanced to the third round after No. 26 seed Florian Mayer was forced to retire in the second set with a leg injury.
d.  No. 8 seed Richard Gasquet advanced to the third round after Teymuraz Gabashvili was forced to retire in the second set citing illness.
e.  David Goffin received a lucky loser spot in the main draw after Michał Przysiężny withdrew with a left arm injury.

References
General

Specific

BNP Paribas Open - Singles
2014 BNP Paribas Open